Kongressfjellet is a mountain in Dickson Land at Spitsbergen, Svalbard. It has a height of 605 m.a.s.l., and is located between the valleys of Idodalen (north) and Sauriedalen (east), and the mountain of Tschermakfjellet (south).

References

Mountains of Spitsbergen